Pecs may refer to:
Pécs, a city in Hungary
Pécsi MFC, a football club in the Hungarian city
The pectoralis major, a major human muscle  
PECS, the Picture Exchange Communication System, a means of communication for children on the autism spectrum
PECS, Plan for European Cooperating State, European Space Agency enlargement charters

See also
 Pec (disambiguation)
 Becs (disambiguation)
 PEX